The 2007 ICC Awards were held on 10 September 2007 in Johannesburg, South Africa. Previous events were held in London (2004), Sydney (2005) and Mumbai (2006). Having been hosted since 2004, the ICC Awards were now into their fourth year. They were presented in association with the Federation of International Cricketers' Associations (FICA) and honours for Associate Player of the Year were also awarded for the first time. The ICC awards the Sir Garfield Sobers Trophy to the Cricketer of the Year, which is considered to be the most prestigious award in world cricket.

Selection Committee
Nominees were voted on by a 56-member academy of current and ex-players and officials from among players chosen by the ICC Selection Committee, chaired by ICC Cricket Hall of Famer Sunil Gavaskar.

Selection Committee members:
 Sunil Gavaskar (chairman)
 Chris Cairns
 Gary Kirsten
 Iqbal Qasim
 Alec Stewart

Winners and nominees
The winners and nominees of various individual awards were:

Cricketer of the Year

Winner: Ricky Ponting (Aus)
Nominees: Shivnarine Chanderpaul (WI), Matthew Hayden (Aus), Michael Hussey (Aus), Mahela Jayawardene (SL), Jacques Kallis (SA), Glenn McGrath (Aus), Muttiah Muralitharan (SL), Kevin Pietersen (Eng), Shaun Pollock (SA), Kumar Sangakkara (SL), Mohammad Yousuf (Pak)

Test Player of the Year

Winner: Mohammad Yousuf (Pak)
Nominees: Mohammad Asif (Pak), Shivnarine Chanderpaul (WI), Stuart Clark (Aus), Matthew Hayden (Aus), Michael Hussey (Aus), Mahela Jayawardene (SL), Zaheer Khan (Ind), Anil Kumble (Ind), Brian Lara (WI), Glenn McGrath (Aus), Muttiah Muralitharan (SL), Makhaya Ntini (SA), Monty Panesar (Eng), Kevin Pietersen (Eng), Shaun Pollock (SA), Ricky Ponting (Aus), Kumar Sangakkara (SL), Ryan Sidebottom (Eng), Shane Warne (Aus)

ODI Player of the Year

Winner: Matthew Hayden (Aus)
Nominees: Shane Bond (NZ), Mark Boucher (SA), Nathan Bracken (Aus), Shivnarine Chanderpaul (WI), Stuart Clark (Aus), Michael Clarke (Aus), Michael Hussey (Aus), Mahela Jayawardene (SL), Jacques Kallis (SA), Brett Lee (Aus), Glenn McGrath (Aus), Muttiah Muralitharan (SL), Jacob Oram (NZ), Kevin Pietersen (Eng), Shaun Pollock (SA), Ricky Ponting (Aus), Kumar Sangakkara (SL), Yuvraj Singh (Ind), Mohammad Yousuf (Pak)

Emerging Player of the Year

Winner: Shaun Tait (Aus)
Nominees: Ravi Bopara (Eng), Shakib Al Hasan (Ban), Mitchell Johnson (Aus), Mushfiqur Rahim (Ban), Ross Taylor (NZ), Chris Tremlett (Eng)

Associate Player of the Year
Winner: Thomas Odoyo (Ken)
Nominees: Ashish Bagai (Can), Andre Botha (Ire), John Davison (Can), Trent Johnston (Ire), Dwayne Leverock (Ber),  Kyle McCallan (Ire), Tanmay Mishra (Ken), Eoin Morgan (Ire), Asif Mulla (Can), Niall O'Brien (Ire), Peter Ongondo (Ken), Irving Romaine (Ber), Abdool Samad (Can), Ryan ten Doeschate (Nth), Steve Tikolo (Ken), Hiren Varaiya (Ken), Ryan Watson (Sco)

Umpire of the Year

Winner: Simon Taufel (Aus)
Nominees: Mark Benson (Eng), Steve Bucknor (WI), Daryl Harper (Aus)

Captain of the Year
Winner: Ricky Ponting (Aus)
Nominee: Mahela Jayawardene (SL)

Women's Cricketer of the Year

Winner: Jhulan Goswami (Ind)
Nominees: Caitriona Beggs (Ire), Holly Colvin (Eng), Rumeli Dhar (Ind), Maria Fahey (NZ), Ashlyn Kilowan (SA), Johmari Logtenberg (SA), Urooj Mumtaz (Pak), Shelley Nitschke (Aus), Rebecca Rolls (NZ), Sajjida Shah (Pak), Lisa Sthalekar (Aus), Claire Taylor (Eng)

Spirit of Cricket
Sri Lanka

ICC World XI Teams

ICC Test Team of the Year

Ricky Ponting was selected as the captain of the Test Team of the Year. In addition to a wicket-keeper, 9 other players and a 12th man were announced as follows:

 Matthew Hayden
 Michael Vaughan
 Ricky Ponting
 Mohammad Yousuf
 Kevin Pietersen
 Michael Hussey
 Kumar Sangakkara (wicket-keeper)
 Stuart Clark
 Makhaya Ntini
 Mohammad Asif
 Muttiah Muralitharan
 Zaheer Khan (12th man)

ICC ODI Team of the Year

Ricky Ponting was also selected as the captain of the ODI Team of the Year. In addition to a wicket-keeper, 9 other players and a 12th man were announced as follows:

 Matthew Hayden
 Sachin Tendulkar
 Ricky Ponting
 Kevin Pietersen
 Shivnarine Chanderpaul
 Jacques Kallis
 Mark Boucher (wicket-keeper)
 Chaminda Vaas
 Shane Bond
 Muttiah Muralitharan
 Glenn McGrath
 Michael Hussey (12th man)

Short lists

Cricketer of the Year
 Shivnarine Chanderpaul
 Kevin Pietersen
 Ricky Ponting
 Mohammad Yousuf

Test Player of the Year
 Muttiah Muralitharan
 Kevin Pietersen
 Ricky Ponting
 Mohammad Yousuf

ODI Player of the Year
 Matthew Hayden
 Jacques Kallis
 Glenn McGrath
 Ricky Ponting

Emerging Player of the Year
 Ravi Bopara
 Shakib Al Hasan
 Shaun Tait
 Ross Taylor

Associate Player of the Year
 Ashish Bagai
 Ryan ten Doeschate
 Thomas Odoyo
 Steve Tikolo

Umpire of the Year
 Mark Benson
 Steve Bucknor
 Simon Taufel

Women's Cricketer of the Year
 Jhulan Goswami
 Lisa Sthalekar
 Claire Taylor

Spirit of Cricket

 Sri Lanka

See also

 International Cricket Council
 ICC Awards
 Sir Garfield Sobers Trophy (Cricketer of the Year)
 ICC Test Player of the Year
 ICC ODI Player of the Year
 David Shepherd Trophy (Umpire of the Year)
 ICC Women's Cricketer of the Year
 ICC Test Team of the Year
 ICC ODI Team of the Year

References

International Cricket Council awards and rankings
Crick
ICC Awards